The FCF Shoulda Been Stars (SB Stars) are a professional Indoor Football team of the Fan Controlled Football League. They are members of the OG Division and are owned by Druski and the Altered State Machine team, Austin Ekeler, and Rachel Lindsay.

On March 2, 2022, the FCF announced the team would be disbanded, as Greg Miller left the team due to the league's involvement in cryptocurrency and NFTs. They were originally known as the FCF Wild Aces and were rebranded to the FCF Shoulda Been Stars before the start of the 2022 season.

Team history

Overview 
On December 2, 2020, The Wild Aces team name and logo were announced, along with three other teams (Glacier Boyz, Beasts, and Zappers). On January 14, 2021, all four team uniforms were revealed. The Stars have one People's Championship titles when they were the Wild Aces. 
On March 2, 2022, Greg Miller left the ownership group and the team will undergo a rebrand. They would be known as the Shoulda Been Stars (SB Stars for short) at the start of the  season. After the league decided to expand to 8 teams in 2022, the Stars were put in the OG Division with the Zappers, Beasts, and Glacier Boyz.

2021 (v1.0)

The Wild Aces won their first franchise game 30–22 against the Glacier Boyz on February 13, 2021. The Aces finished the season 2–2 and earning 2nd-place in the league's regular season standings. Their week two franchise-tagged super back Ladarius Galloway was given the regular season Offensive MVP and Joseph Putu was given the Defensive MVP. The Beasts (3–1) finished 1st, the Zappers (2–2) finished 3rd, and the Glacier Boyz (1–3) finished 4th. They ultimately ended up winning against the #3 seed Zappers 32–6 in the semi-finals, advancing to the People's Championship. 

Right before the game, it was revealed that former Baylor and XFL defensive end Shawn Oakman had signed with the Wild Aces. The Wild Aces won the People's Championship v1.0 game against the #4 seed Glacier Boyz 46–40, finishing the 2021 Fan Controlled Football season 4–2 and earning their 1st championship in franchise history. Dual-threat quarterback Ed Crouch was named People's Championship Gatorade MVP. Crouch went 4 for 9 with 72 yards and 1 passing touchdown. He also rushed 6 times for 53 yards and added a rushing touchdown. His rushing touchdown came on the last play of the game where he faked a run to Galloway and outran a defender to touch the pilon with no time left on the clock.

2022 (v2.0)
After becoming the first team to rebrand in FCF history, the SB Stars looked to continue their winning standards after becoming the 2021 People's Champions.

The Stars finished 4-3, which was good enough to finish in 3rd place behind the FCF Bored Ape Football Club (5-2) and the FCF Knights of Degen (4-3). The SB Stars would go on to lose to the FCF Zappers 50–24 in the first round, marking their first-ever playoff loss.

Final roster

Statistics and players

Season-by-season results 
List of Shoulda Been Stars seasons

As of September 13, 2022

Records

References 

Fan Controlled Football
Indoor American football teams in the United States
American football teams established in 2020
2020 establishments in the United States